Phronimoidea is a superfamily of plankton in the sub-order Hyperiidea.

Families 
Bougisidae Zeidler, 2004
Cystisomatidae Willemöes-Suhm, 1875
Dairellidae Bovallius, 1887
Hyperiidae Dana, 1852
Iulopididae Zeidler, 2004
Lestrigonidae Zeidler, 2004
Phronimidae Rafinesque, 1815
Phrosinidae Dana, 1852

References 

Amphipoda
Animals described in 1815
Arthropod superfamilies